S.O.S.: Sexo y otros secretos (English: S.O.S.: Sex and Other Secrets) is a Mexican television series produced by Javier Williams and Andrea Salas that premiered on Canal 5 on May 15, 2007 and ended on December 9, 2008. It stars Susana Zabaleta, Susana González, Luz María Zetina, Marina de Tavira, Claudia Ramírez, and Chantal Andere. The series narrates the lives of five women facing a world full of sex, infidelities and secrets.

Premise
Five women have different ways of seeing life, sometimes complementary and sometimes contrary, but they share a concept of solidarity and friendship between them that makes them a charming group. Each episode tells how they live, how they met, how their friendship was born, their most intimate desires and the secrets that they keep for fear of being rejected or judged. The series also shows the sexual experiences that have marked their character, the desire to take charge of their lives and become complete women, to find self-confidence and personal satisfaction, and share their struggle to overcome their limitations and grow like human beings.

Cast

Main
 Susana Zabaleta as Sofía (season 1)
 Susana González as Tania
 Luz María Zetina as Maggie
 Marina de Tavira as Pamela
 Claudia Ramírez as Irene
 Julio Bracho as Xavier (season 1; guest in season 2)
 Pedro Damián as Genaro (season 1)
 Benny Ibarra as Gabriel
 Miguel Rodarte as Boris
 Emilio Echevarría as Misty (season 1)
 José Angel Bichir as Beto (season 1)
 Paty Díaz as Marcia (season 1)
 Cristina Mason as Irenita
 Darío T. Pie as Darío de Gavira (season 1)
 Zuria Vega as Roberta
 Azela Robinson as Lucía (season 1)
 Enrique Singer as Levy (season 2)
 Odiseo Bichir as Tovar (season 2)
 Rafael Amaya as Martín (season 2)
 Chantal Andere as Natalia (season 2)

Recurring 
 Diana Bracho as Isadora

Episodes

Series overview

Season 1 (2007)

Season 2 (2008)

Home release
Xenon Entertainment released Sexo y otros secretos Primera Temporada on October 14, 2008. The second season has not been released.

Awards and nominations

References

External links

2007 Mexican television series debuts
2008 Mexican television series endings
Television series by Televisa
Mexican comedy television series
Mexican drama television series
Mexican television series
Spanish-language television shows